Leninski, formerly also Аciačyzna, Hatečyzna and Hataŭščyzna-Ździtaviec, is an agro-town in Zhabinka District of Brest Region, Belarus. It is located close to the Belarusian–Polish border.

External links 
Manor of Bielski

Populated places in Brest Region
Brest Litovsk Voivodeship
Grodno Governorate
Polesie Voivodeship
Agrotowns in Belarus
Brest Region